The 2016 season was Perak's 13th consecutive season in the Malaysian Super League.

Players

First-team squad

* Games and goals counted for the domestic league only
* Player names in bold denotes player that left mid-season

Transfers

In

December to January

In

June to July

Out

December to January

June to July

Coaching staff

Club officials

Under new management, the Presidency was taken over by the Secretary General State of Perak, Yang Berhormat Dato' Abdul Puhat Mat Nayan on 4 October 2015.

Administrative staff
 President: YB Dato' Abdul Puhat Mat Nayan
 Deputy President: Dato' Shahrul Zaman Yahya
 Vice President 1: Datuk Rasidi Ibrahim
 Vice President 2: Datuk Muhammad Yadzan Mohammad
 Vice President 3: Datuk G. Irudianathan
 Treasurer: Khairul Azwan Dato' Harun
 Executive Committee Members 1: Reduan Amir Hamzah
 Executive Committee Members 2: Mahhadee Ramlee
 Executive Committee Members 3: Mohd Rizairi Jamaludin
 Executive Committee Members 4: Zainal Anuar Abdul Rashid
 Executive Committee Members 5: Mohd Jamil Zakaria
 Executive Committee Members 6: Abdul Jamil Othman
 Executive Committee Members 7: Johari Baharom
 Executive Committee Members 8: Jurij Jamaludin
 Executive Committee Members 9: Najib Mokhtar

Competitions

Super League

League table

Matches

FA Cup

Knockout stage

Quarter-finals

Semi-finals

Malaysia Cup

Group stage

Statistics

Top scorers
The list is sorted by shirt number when total goals are equal.

References

Perak F.C. seasons
Perak FA